is a railway station on the Aizu Railway Aizu Line in the town of Shimogō, Minamiaizu District, Fukushima Prefecture, Japan, operated by the Aizu Railway. Yagoshima Station opened on December 27, 1934

Lines

Station layout
Yagoshima Station has one side platform serving a single bi-directional track. The station is unattended.

Adjacent stations

External links

 Aizu Railway Station information 

Railway stations in Fukushima Prefecture
Aizu Line
Railway stations in Japan opened in 1934
Shimogō, Fukushima